Fadhil Salim (born 24 January 1983) is a Singaporean goalkeeper who played for S.League club Hougang United FC.

Fadhil started playing for Woodland Wellington FC in 2002. In 2010, he joined Hougang United FC. 

Fadhil was nominated by the club for the YEO'S People's Choice Award 2010 for the 2010 S.League season.

Fadhil was voted S.League goalkeeper of the of 2011,2012 and 2013.

Career

References

3. https://web.archive.org/web/20130928164202/http://kallangroar.com/news/exclusive-interviews/exclusively-fadhil-salim/

4. http://www.goal.com/en-sg/news/3880/singapore/2013/07/31/4153439/fadhil-honoured-by-singapore-national-team-call-up?ICID=OP

5. http://www.goal.com/en-sg/news/3883/features/2013/06/01/4015245/singa-goal-sleague-player-of-the-month-fadhil-salim?ICID=AR_RA_3

Living people
1983 births
Singaporean footballers
Woodlands Wellington FC players
Hougang United FC players
Gombak United FC players
Singapore Premier League players
Association football goalkeepers